Irina Lukomskaya (born ) is a Kazakhstani female volleyball player. She is a member of the Kazakhstan women's national volleyball team and played for Zhetysu Almaty in 2014. She was part of the Kazakhstani national team at the 2014 FIVB Volleyball Women's World Championship in Italy.

Clubs
  Zhetysu Almaty (2014)

References

1991 births
Living people
Kazakhstani women's volleyball players
Place of birth missing (living people)
Asian Games medalists in volleyball
Volleyball players at the 2010 Asian Games
Medalists at the 2010 Asian Games
Asian Games bronze medalists for Kazakhstan
21st-century Kazakhstani women